My Little Princess is a 2011 drama film directed by Eva Ionesco and inspired by her relationship with her mother, the well-known artistic photographer Irina Ionesco whose pictures of her young daughter caused controversy when they were published back in the 1970s.

Plot
Violetta is raised by her grandmother ("Mamie", the French equivalent of "Grandma").  Her mother Hanna tries to make a living on taking photographs and concentrates on her dreams to become a famous artist. In order to succeed as an artist she doesn't worry about dating men of questionable reputation.  Only every now and then her mother visits her daughter but during these occasions it occurs to her that her daughter could be a potential model. She starts exploiting her daughter who by transforming into a kind of Lolita becomes increasingly alienated from other children of her age. At school she is eventually frequently insulted and rejected. Then Mamie dies and Hanna's photographs are about to unequivocally overstep the line of acceptability. Hanna even coerces Violetta mercilessly into cooperation by withholding her food in case she doesn't agree to pose for increasingly daring photographs. Eventually Hanna's right of custody for her twelve-year-old daughter is at stake.

Cast 
 Isabelle Huppert as Hanna Giurgiu
 Anamaria Vartolomei as Violetta Giurgiu
 Denis Lavant as Ernst
 Louis-Do de Lencquesaing as Antoine Dupuis
 Georgetta Leahu as Mamie
 Jethro Cave as Updike 
 Pascal Bongard as Jean 
 Anne Benoît as Madame Chenus
 Johanna Degris-Agogue as Apolline 
 Déborah Révy as Nadia 
 Lou Lesage as Rose 
 Nicolas Maury as Louis 
 Pauline Jacquart as Fifi

Reception
German magazine Focus found Anamaria Vartolomei was convincing as a young girl whose life eventually turns into a nightmare because of her mother's artistic ambitions in 1970s Paris. 

Critics also commented that Anamaria Vartolomei and Isabelle Huppert have portrayed the lack of affection so convincingly that they have even been accused of interacting insufficiently as actors. Regarding this, Huppert told German newspaper Frankfurter Allgemeine Zeitung in an interview that shooting of the film had been one of her more peculiar professional experiences because on the set she had had the feeling she was indeed the director's mother.

References

External links

2010s French-language films
2010s Romanian-language films
French biographical films
2011 directorial debut films
2011 films
Films set in the 20th century
French drama films
Films directed by Eva Ionesco
Romanian drama films
Romanian biographical films
2011 drama films
2011 multilingual films
French multilingual films
Romanian multilingual films
2010s French films